"Time Will Reveal" is a single by DeBarge and released in September 1983 as the first single off the group's third album, In a Special Way on the Gordy label.  It was also the group's biggest hit prior to the group's 1985 hit, "Rhythm of the Night".

Overview

Recording
By 1983, DeBarge was riding off the crossover success of their 1982 second album, All This Love, which included the title track and "I Like It". Boosted by its success, the group recorded a similar album with In a Special Way. Among the songs chosen for a single was the crossover hit "Time Will Reveal", which was written by sister Bunny DeBarge & brothers El and Bobby.

Reception
Much like their two previous singles, DeBarge found a hit with "Time Will Reveal", which reached number one on the Billboard R&B singles chart and number 18 on the US pop singles chart. The success of this record and the preceding singles helped the group attain an opening slot for Luther Vandross' U.S. tour of 1984, in which by then DeBarge had become a national attraction, with its early success being compared to the earlier Motown family act, The Jackson 5.

Charts

Personnel
 Lead vocals and keyboards by El DeBarge
 Background vocals by El DeBarge, Randy DeBarge and Bunny DeBarge
 Drums - Ricky Lawson
 Bass - Nathan East
 Percussion - Paulinho Da Costa
 String Arrangement by Benjamin F. Wright, Jr. 
 Produced by El DeBarge
 Written by El DeBarge and Tommy DeBarge
 Associate Producer - Tommy DeBarge 
 Engineer - Barney Perkins

In popular culture
 The Game, a comedy-drama television series, played the song on Season 4: Episode 6 "Men in Crisis" in 2011.

Cover versions

 In 1996, R&B group Blackstreet covered the song in the closing track on their second studio album Another Level, as "The Lord is Real".
 In 1997, R&B group Shades covered the song on their debut album Shades.
 In 2004, Boyz II Men covered the song on their Throwback, Vol. 1 album.
 In 2004, Jed Madela covered the song on his album Songs Rediscovered.
 In 2005, soul singer Janelle Monáe did a cover of the song on the album Got Purp? Vol. 2 by the Purple Ribbon All-Stars after originally featuring the recording on her 2003 demo album, The Audition.
 In 2008, Filipino R&B/pop singer Jay R covered the song on his album Soul in Love.
 In 2011, American singer Mayer Hawthorne covered the song on the album Stones Throw Direct to Disc #1 recorded live directly to vinyl at Capsule Labs in Los Angeles.
 In 2016, saxophonist Kim Waters covered the song on his album Rhythm and Romance with James Robinson as background vocalist.

See also
 List of number-one R&B singles of 1983 (U.S.)

References

1983 singles
DeBarge songs
Songs written by El DeBarge
Gordy Records singles
1983 songs
Contemporary R&B ballads
1980s ballads